London Buses route 388 is a Transport for London contracted bus route in London, England. Running between Stratford City bus station and London Bridge bus station, it is operated by Stagecoach London.

History
Route 388 commenced operating on 25 January 2003 between Hackney Wick and Mansion House station in preparation for the introduction of the London congestion charge. It was operated by CT Plus' Ash Grove (HK) with East Lancs Lolyne bodied Dennis Trident 2s.

On 25 September 2004, it was extended to Blackfriars station. While Blackfriars station was rebuilt as part of the Thameslink Programme, route 388 was extended on 16 August 2008 to Temple station, and again on 1 November 2008 to Embankment station.  It was cut back to Blackfriars on 24 March 2012.

Upon being re-tendered, the route was retained with a new contract commencing in January 2010.

On 14 December 2013, route 388 was extended from Hackney Wick to Stratford City bus station via the Queen Elizabeth Olympic Park, replacing route 588.

In 2017, the route was extended from Blackfriars to Elephant and Castle.

On 27th August 2022, route 388 was included in the sale of HCT Group's ‘red bus’ operations to Stagecoach London.

Current route
Route 388 operates via these primary locations:

Stratford City bus station  for Stratford station     
Queen Elizabeth Olympic Park
Hackney Wick
Victoria Park
South Hackney
Cambridge Heath station  
York Hall
Bethnal Green station 
Shoreditch High Street station 
Bishopsgate
Liverpool Street station    
Bank station  
London Bridge bus station

References

External links

Bus routes in London
Transport in the London Borough of Hackney
Transport in the London Borough of Newham
Transport in the City of London